Christiane Rochefort (17 July 1917 – 24 April 1998) was a French feminist writer. She was born into a left-wing working class Parisian family; her father joined the International Brigades during the Spanish Civil War.  Rochefort worked as a journalist and spent fifteen years as a press attaché to the Cannes Film Festival before publishing her first novel, Le Repos du guerrier (The Warrior's Rest), in 1958. Like several of her later novels, Le Repos du guerrier was a bestseller; in 1962 it was adapted into a popular film directed by Roger Vadim and starring Brigitte Bardot. Her novels are divided between social realist satires set in present-day France and utopian or dystopian fantasies.  She won the Prix Médicis in 1988. Rochefort's novels also have
strong sexual elements.

Novels 

Cendres et or" (1956)Le repos du guerrier (1958) – Warrior's Rest (translated by Lowell Bair, 1959)Les petits enfants du siècle (1961) – Children of Heaven (translated by Linda Asher, 1962)/Josyane and the Welfare (translated by Edward Hyams, 1963) Les stances à Sophie (1963) - Cat's Don't Care for Money (translated by Helen Eustis, 1965)Une rose pour Morrison (1966) (dedicated to Mister Bob Dylan)Printemps au parking (1969)Archaos, ou le Jardin Etincelant (1972)Encore heureux qu'on va vers l'été (1975)Quand tu vas chez les femmes (1982)La porte du fond (1988) Prix Médicis (dedicated to Jeffrey Moussaieff Masson)Conversations sans paroles'' (1997)

See also 
 Les Stances a Sophie
 Catherine Baker

References

Bibliography
 Jean-Louis de Rambures, "Comment travaillent les écrivains", Paris 1978 (interview with Ch. Rochefort, in French)

External links 
 Christiane Rochefort: Les enfants d'abord
 An extract from Les Petits Enfants du siècle
 Margaret-Anne Hutton: Countering The Culture: The Novels of Christiane Rochefort
 Isabelle Constant: Les mots étincelants de Christiane Rochefort: langages d'utopie

French feminist writers
French erotica writers
1917 births
1998 deaths
Prix Médicis winners
Burials at Père Lachaise Cemetery
20th-century French women writers
Women erotica writers
Signatories of the 1971 Manifesto of the 343